The 1988 Baseball World Cup (BWC) was the 30th international Men's amateur baseball tournament. The tournament was sanctioned by the International Baseball Federation, which titled it the Amateur World Series from the 1938 tournament through the 1986 AWS. The tournament took place, for the second time, in Italy, from August 23 to September 7, and was won by Cubaits 19th overall victory (their first under the BWC name).

There were 12 participating countries.

The next nine competitions were also held as the BWC tournament, then was replaced in 2015 by the quadrennial WBSC Premier12.

First round

Standings

Final round

Final standings

Awards

References

External links
XXX Baseball World Cup - XXX Copa del Mundo de Béisbol
Archives 1988 

World Cup
Baseball World Cup
Baseball World Cup
1988
August 1988 sports events in Europe
September 1988 sports events in Europe